The John Hansard Gallery is a contemporary visual art gallery and part of the University of Southampton.

History 
The John Hansard Building was originally located in building 50 in the University of Southampton building coding scheme. It was built in 1959 and was originally designed to house a tidal model of the Solent. The architect was Ronald Sims. The building was converted to gallery use in 1979-1980.

Relocation
In 2018 the gallery moved to a new location in the centre of Southampton, opposite Guildhall Square, as part of a new arts complex. The new gallery opened on 12 May. The building it is in was designed by CZWG while the inside of the gallery was designed by Glenn Howells.

Exhibitions
Previous exhibitions have included "Panacea", an artist's collaboration between Michael Pinsky and Walker & Bromwich; "There Where You Are Not" by Alec Finlay, Jeremy Millar, and Guy Moreton; "Lines in the Sand" by Joan Jonas; and "20 Million Mexicans Can't be Wrong" with Francis Alÿs and Santiago Sierra.

From 11 February to 31 March 2012, the gallery hosted an art exhibition of new cutting edge 3d technology by designer David Cotterrell. David is an installation artist and launched this new exhibition entitled 'Monsters of the Id.' using a new 3d technique of creating art work. This interprets his experiences through image manipulation, staging, CGI, 3D scanning, 3D printing and new projection techniques.

The opening exhibition in the new building consisted of works by Gerhard Richter, followed by "Time after Time", curated by Stephen Foster, gallery director.

References

External links
John Hansard Gallery - official site
John Hansard Gallery - open data service webpage

Open data
John Hansard Gallery - RDF Description from the University of Southampton

Art museums and galleries in Hampshire
Museums in Southampton
University museums in England
Contemporary art galleries in England
Buildings and structures in Southampton